Ock or OCK may refer to:

River Ock (disambiguation), three rivers in England
 Ok (Korean name), also spelt Ock
Ock Joo-hyun (born 1980), South Korean K-pop singer and musical theatre actress
Océano Club de Kerkennah, a Tunisian football club
Olympique Club de Khouribga, a Moroccan football club
Olympic Committee of Kosovo

See also
Doctor Octopus, an enemy of Spider-Man often called "Doc Ock"
Oakland County Child Killer serial killer (Detroit).